Events from the year 1932 in the United Kingdom.

Incumbents
 Monarch – George V
 Prime Minister – Ramsay MacDonald (Coalition)
 Parliament – 36th

Events
 1 January — the English Folk Dance and Song Society holds its first festival under this name following merger of the Folk-Song Society and the English Folk Dance Society.
 8 January — the Archbishop of Canterbury forbids church remarriage of divorcees.
 24 January — inmates at Dartmoor Prison mutiny.
 26 January — British submarine  sinks off the Dorset coast with all sixty hands.
 4-15 February — Great Britain and Northern Ireland compete in the Winter Olympics at Lake Placid, New York but do not win any medals.

 1 March — Import Duties Act re-establishes protective trade tariffs.
 15 March — first BBC radio broadcast from the new Broadcasting House in London; all programmes transfer from 15 May.
 6 April – Ministry of Health encourages local councils to engage in widespread slum clearance.
 13 April — mass trespass of Kinder Scout, a wilful trespass by ramblers at Kinder Scout, in the Peak District of England, to protest against lack of free public access to open country.
 23 April — new Shakespeare Memorial Theatre opens in Stratford-upon-Avon; designed by Elisabeth Scott, it is the country's first important work by a woman architect.
 1 May — protestors clash with police in Hyde Park, London, during a May day protest against Japan's attitude towards China when they try to march on the Japanese Embassy.
 10 May — James Chadwick discovers the neutron.
 26 May — the Scots law case of Donoghue v Stevenson is decided in the House of Lords, establishing the modern concept of a duty of care in cases of negligence.
 4 July — George Carwardine patents the Anglepoise lamp.
 12 July — Hedley Verity of Yorkshire establishes a new first-class cricket record by taking all ten wickets for only ten runs against Nottinghamshire on a pitch affected by a storm.
 19 July — King George V opens the replacement Lambeth Bridge across the Thames in London.
 30 July-14 August — Great Britain and Northern Ireland compete at the Olympics in Los Angeles, California and win 4 gold, 7 silver and 5 bronze.
 1 August — Forrest Mars produces the first Mars bar in his Slough factory.
 22 August — first experimental television broadcast by the BBC.
 20 September — Methodist Union: the Methodist Church is formed in Britain by merger of the Wesleyan Methodist Church, the Primitive Methodists and the United Methodist Church.
 26 September — first contingent of the National Hunger March leaves Glasgow.
 October
 Oswald Mosley founds the British Union of Fascists.
 Anglo-Irish Trade War begins.
 3 October — The Times newspaper first appears set in the Times New Roman typeface devised by Stanley Morison.
 7 October — Thomas Beecham establishes the London Philharmonic Orchestra.
 10 October — a mine cage accident at Bickershaw Colliery in the Lancashire Coalfield drowns 19.
 13 October — Britain grants independence to Iraq in exchange for a restrictive long-term military alliance.
 27 October — arrival of the Hunger March in London leads to several violent clashes with police.
 14 November — book tokens go on sale in the UK.
 30 November — the BBC begins a series of radio broadcasts to mark the 75th birthday of Sir Edward Elgar.
 2 December — English cricket team in Australia in 1932–33: opening of the “bodyline” series.
 5 December — the comic strip character Jane first appears in the Daily Mirror.
 10 December
 John Galsworthy wins the Nobel Prize in Literature "for his distinguished art of narration which takes its highest form in The Forsyte Saga".
 Charles Scott Sherrington and Edgar Adrian, 1st Baron Adrian, win the Nobel Prize in Physiology or Medicine "for their discoveries regarding the functions of neurons".
 19 December — the BBC Empire Service, later known as the BBC World Service, begins broadcasting using a shortwave radio facility at its Daventry transmitting station.
 25 December — King George V delivers the first Royal Christmas Message on the BBC Empire Service from Sandringham House; the text has been written by Rudyard Kipling.

Undated
 Opening of the Hoover Building on the Western Avenue in Perivale, Middlesex, a noted example of Art Deco architecture, designed by Wallis, Gilbert and Partners for The Hoover Company.
 Production of Fordson tractors in the U.K. begins at Dagenham in Essex.
 Production of Weetabix breakfast cereal in the U.K. begins at Burton Latimer in Northamptonshire.

Publications
 Agatha Christie's Hercule Poirot novel Peril at End House.
 Lewis Grassic Gibbon's novel Sunset Song, first in A Scots Quair trilogy.
 Stella Gibbons' parodic novel Cold Comfort Farm.
 J. B. S. Haldane's book The Causes of Evolution, unifying Mendelian genetics and evolutionary science.
 Aldous Huxley's dystopian novel Brave New World.
 Captain W. E. Johns' first Biggles aviation stories, collected as The Camels are Coming.
 F. R. Leavis' book New Bearings in English Poetry.
 Q. D. Leavis' book Fiction and the Reading Public.
 John Cowper Powys' novel A Glastonbury Romance.
 Evelyn Waugh's novel Black Mischief.
 First issue of the journal of literary criticism Scrutiny: a quarterly review edited by F. R. Leavis (published in May).
 First issue of the magazine Woman's Own.

Births

 2 January – Peter Redgrove, poet (died 2003)
 4 January – Thelma Holt, actress and producer
 12 January – Des O'Connor, comedian, singer and television presenter (died 2020)
 14 January – Timothy Sprigge, philosopher (died 2007)
 15 January – Louis George Alexander, teacher and author (died 2002)
 19 January – Russ Hamilton, singer (died 2008)
 23 January – George Allen, footballer (died 2016)
 29 January – Tommy Taylor, footballer (died 1958)
 30 January – Lady Mary Colman, socialite and philanthropist (died 2021)
 1 February – John Nott, Conservative politician
 8 February
Cliff Allison, racing driver (died 2005)
Elspeth Howe, public servant (died 2022)
Jean Saunders, romantic novelist (died 2011)
 11 February – Dennis Skinner, politician
 12 February – Richard Rougier, judge (died 2007)
 13 February
 David Neal, actor (died 2000) 
 Barbara Shelley, actress (died 2021)
 14 February – Peter Ball, bishop and sex offender (died 2019)
 15 February – Adrian Swire, English businessman (died 2018)
 25 February –  Tony Brooks, racing driver (died 2022)
 27 February – Elizabeth Taylor, actress (died 2011)
 28 February – Brian Moore, football commentator (died 2001)
 21 March – Tom Watson, actor (died 2001)
 25 March – Martin Brandon-Bravo, politician (died 2018)
 27 March – Patrick Newell, actor (died 1988) 
 9 April – Jack Smethurst, actor (died 2022)
 10 April – Adrian Henri, Liverpool poet (died 2000)
 14 April – Bob Grant, actor, comedian and writer (died 2003)
 15 April – John T. Lewis, Welsh physicist (died 2004)
 25 April
 David Frederick Case, audiobook narrator (died 2005)
 William Roache, actor (Coronation Street)
 26 April – Michael Smith, chemist, Nobel Prize laureate (died 2000 in Canada)
 4 May – Ivor Wood, television animator (died 2004)
 7 May – Jenny Joseph, poet (died 2018)
 8 May – Phyllida Law, actress
 9 May – Gavin Lyall, novelist (died 2003)
 12 May – Derek Malcolm, historian and critic
 19 May – Alma Cogan, singer (died 1966)
 24 May – Arnold Wesker, dramatist (died 2016)
 29 May – Prof. Walker H. Land, academic bioengineering researcher
 30 May
 Ray Cooney, farceur
 Ivor Richard, Welsh Labour politician (died 2018)
 8 June – Ray Illingworth, cricketer (died 2021)
 18 June – Geoffrey Hill, poet (died 2016)
 21 June – Bernard Ingham journalist and government press secretary (died 2023)
 22 June
 Prunella Scales, actress
 John Wakeham, businessman and Conservative Party politician
 25 June
 Peter Blake, pop artist
 Charles Morrison, politician (died 2005)
 Tim Parnell, racing driver (died 2017)
 26 June – John Wall, inventor (died 2018)
 27 June
 Alan Warren, Anglican priest and author (died 2020)
 Hugh Wood, composer (died 2021)
 4 July – Matt Crowe, Scottish football (soccer) player (died 2017)
 8 July
Roy Proverbs, football (soccer) player (died 2017)
Brian Walden, politician and political interviewer (died 2019)
 10 July – George Black, Royal Air Force officer  
 16 July – John Chilton, jazz trumpeter (died 2016)
 17 July – Colin Webster, Welsh footballer (died 2001)
 21 July – Vilma Hollingbery, actress
 23 July
Hugh Davies, Welsh cricketer (died 2017)
Tony Dean, racing driver (died 2008)
 26 July – Neil McCarthy, actor (died 1985) 
 28 July – Russell Johnston, politician (died 2008)
 6 August – Howard Hodgkin, painter and print-maker (died 2017)
 9 August – Reginald Bosanquet, television news presenter (died 1984)
 11 August – Eric Varley, politician (died 2008)
 17 August – V. S. Naipaul, Trinidadian-born writer (died 2018)
 20 August – Anthony Ainley, actor (died 2004)
 23 August – Christopher Parsons, film-maker (died 2002)
 24 August
Cormac Murphy-O'Connor, cardinal and Archbishop of Westminster (died 2017)
W. Morgan Sheppard, actor (died 2019)
 1 September – Raymond Durgnat, film critic (died 2002)
 4 September – Dinsdale Landen, actor (died 2003)
 7 September – Malcolm Bradbury, author and academic (died 2000)
 9 September – Alice Thomas Ellis, writer (died 2005)
 11 September
 Peter Anderson, footballer (died 2009)
 Ian Hamer, jazz trumpeter (died 2006)
 22 September – Michael Barnes, politician (died 2018)
 27 September – Michael Colvin, Conservative politician (died 2000)
 4 October – Edward Judd, actor (died 2009)
 5 October – Michael John Rogers, ornithologist (died 2006)
 8 October – Ray Reardon, Welsh snooker player
 9 October – Colin Clark, film-maker (died 2002)
 10 October – Harry Smith, footballer
 15 October – Vince Karalius, English rugby league footballer and coach (died 2008)
 24 October – Adrian Mitchell, poet and novelist (died 2008)
 25 October – Maurice Dodd, cartoonist (died 2005)
 6 November – Ron Saunders, footballer and manager (died 2019)
 4 November – Joyce Blair, actress (died 2006)
 11 November – John Zamet, periodontist (died 2007)
 15 November – Petula Clark, singer, actress and songwriter
 18 November – Trevor Baxter, actor and playwright (died 2017)
 20 November – Richard Dawson, comedian and game show host (died 2012)
 21 November – Beryl Bainbridge, novelist (died 2010)
 30 November – Arthur Hopcraft, scriptwriter (died 2004)
 15 December – John Meurig Thomas, scientist (died 2020)
 18 December – Marian Wenzel, art historian (died 2002)
 19 December – Crispin Nash-Williams, mathematician (died 2001)
 24 December – Colin Cowdrey, cricketer (died 2000)
 28 December – Roy Hattersley, Labour politician

Deaths
 8 January – William Graham, Scottish politician (born 1887)
 13 January – Ernest Mangnall, football manager (born 1866)
 21 January – Lytton Strachey, writer and biographer (born 1880)
 24 January – Sir Alfred Yarrow, shipbuilder and philanthropist (born 1842)
 10 February – Edgar Wallace, novelist and screenwriter (born 1875)
 4 March – Fawcet Wray, admiral (born 1873)
 11 March – Dora Carrington, painter (born 1893)
 16 March – Harold Monro, poet and bookshop proprietor (born 1879)
 26 April – William Lockwood, cricketer (born 1868)
 13 June – Alexander Bethell, admiral (born 1855)
 6 July – Kenneth Grahame, author (born 1859)
 16 July – Herbert Plumer, 1st Viscount Plumer, general (born 1857)
 22 July – J. Meade Falkner, novelist and poet (born 1858)
 23 July – Tenby Davies, Welsh sprinter (born 1884)
 19 August – E. S. Prior, Arts and Crafts architect and theorist (born 1852)
 16 September – Ronald Ross, physician, recipient of the Nobel Prize in Physiology or Medicine (born 1857)
 1 October – W. G. Collingwood, painter and author (born 1854)
 30 October – Paul Methuen, 3rd Baron Methuen, field marshal (born 1845)
 12 November – Sir Dugald Clerk, mechanical engineer (born 1854)
 13 November – Catherine Isabella Dodd, education writer and novelist (born 1860)
 8 December – Gertrude Jekyll, garden designer, writer and artist (born 1843)

See also
 List of British films of 1932

References

 
Years of the 20th century in the United Kingdom